Yi Gong may refer to:

Duke Yi (disambiguation)
Sunjo of Joseon (1790–1834), Joseon king, personal name Yi Gong
Gong Yi (born 1941), Chinese musician who plays the guqin (Gong is his surname)